Kaushal Kishore (1942–1999) was an Indian polymer chemist and head of the department of inorganic and physical Chemistry at the Indian Institute of Science (IISc). He was known for his researches on thermochemistry and combustion of polymers. and was an elected fellow of the National Academy of Sciences, India, Indian National Science Academy, and the Indian Academy of Sciences. The Council of Scientific and Industrial Research, the apex agency of the Government of India for scientific research, awarded him the Shanti Swarup Bhatnagar Prize for Science and Technology, one of the highest Indian science awards, in 1988, for his contributions to chemical sciences.

Biography 

Kaushal Kishore, born on the last day of 1942 in the Indian state of Uttar Pradesh, did his graduate studies in chemistry at Lucknow University and obtained his master's degree from the same institution before enrolling for doctoral studies at Deen Dayal Upadhyay Gorakhpur University where he studied under the guidance of R. P. Rastogi to secure a PhD for his thesis on mechanism of combustion of non-hypergolic propellants. His career started at Gorakhpur University as a teaching faculty but he moved to the Indian Institute of Science in 1974 where he rose in ranks to head the department of inorganic and physical chemistry from 1994. His early researches were on thermochemistry and combustion of polymers with focus on the kinetics and thermodynamics of combustion, particularly with solid propellants. These researches assisted him in discovering autopyrolysis, a term he coined for a phenomenon related to accelerated combustion caused by polyperoxides, details of which he published in one of his articles. He was credited with developing Flammability Index, a dimensionless quantity to assess the flammability of combustible materials. He also worked on plasticization and his studies have assisted in widening the understanding of plasticizers and flame-retardants containing phosphorus. He published several articles in peer-reviewed journals and the online repository of the Indian Academy of Sciences has listed 165 of them. He was associated with the Journal of Applied Polymer Science as a member of their editorial board and sat on a number of councils and committees.

Kishore lived in Bengaluru and it was here he died on 2 March 1999, the day of the Indian festival Holi, succumbing to a cardiac arrest at the age of 56.

Awards and honors 
The Council of Scientific and Industrial Research awarded Kishore the Shanti Swarup Bhatnagar Prize, one of the highest Indian science awards, in 1988. He received the Indian Thermal Analysis Award of NICAR in 1991. The Indian Academy of Sciences elected him as their fellow in 1991 and the Indian National Science Academy followed suit in 1999. He was also a fellow of the National Academy of Sciences, India. He was also associated with Indian Thermal Analysis Society, Indian High Energy Materials Society, Indian Polymer Society and Materials Research Society of India as their Life Member.

Selected bibliography

See also 
 Plasticizer

Notes

References 

Recipients of the Shanti Swarup Bhatnagar Award in Chemical Science
1942 births
Indian scientific authors
Fellows of the Indian Academy of Sciences
Fellows of the Indian National Science Academy
1999 deaths
Scientists from Uttar Pradesh
Indian physical chemists
Indian polymer scientists and engineers
Fellows of The National Academy of Sciences, India
University of Lucknow alumni
Deen Dayal Upadhyay Gorakhpur University alumni
Academic staff of Deen Dayal Upadhyay Gorakhpur University
Academic staff of the Indian Institute of Science
20th-century Indian chemists